Catesbaea is a genus of flowering plants in the family Rubiaceae. It occurs in the West Indies, The Bahamas, and the Florida Keys. The genus is named in honour of English naturalist Mark Catesby.

Species 
 Catesbaea ekmaniana Urb. - Haiti
 Catesbaea flaviflora Urb. - Cuba
 Catesbaea foliosa Millsp. - Bahamas, Turks & Caicos Islands
 Catesbaea fuertesii Urb. - Dominican Republic
 Catesbaea gamboana Urb. - Cuba
 Catesbaea glabra Urb. - Dominican Republic, Haiti
 Catesbaea grayi Griseb. - Cuba, Haiti
 Catesbaea holacantha C.Wright ex Griseb. - Cuba
 Catesbaea longispina A.Rich. - Cuba
 Catesbaea macrantha C.Wright - Cuba
 Catesbaea melanocarpa Urb. - tropical lilythorn - Puerto Rico, Leeward Islands
 Catesbaea microcarpa Urb. - Haiti
 Catesbaea nana Greenm. - Cuba
 Catesbaea parviflora Sw. - smallflower lilythorn or dune lilythorn - Florida Keys, Bahamas, Turks & Caicos Islands, Cayman Islands, Cuba, Dominican Republic, Haiti, Jamaica, Puerto Rico
 Catesbaea parvifolia DC. - Dominican Republic, Haiti
 Catesbaea sphaerocarpa Urb. - Haiti
 Catesbaea spinosa L. - Cuba, Bahamas

References

External links 
 USDA Plants Profile

Rubiaceae genera
Chiococceae
Flora of the Caribbean